Hobart College may refer to:
 A college which is part of Hobart and William Smith Colleges in Geneva, New York, U.S. 
 Hobart College (Tasmania), a secondary school in Tasmania, Australia